The 2013 Missouri State Bears football team represented Missouri State University in the 2013 NCAA Division I FCS football season. They were led by eighth-year head coach Terry Allen and played their home games at the Plaster Sports Complex. They were a member of the Missouri Valley Football Conference. They finished the season 5–7, 5–3 in MFVC play to finish in a four way tie for second place.

Schedule

<ref>Schedule<ref>
^Game aired on a tape delayed basis

References

Missouri State
Missouri State Bears football seasons
Missouri State Bears football